WUCO (1550 AM) is a radio station broadcasting a sports format. Licensed to Morganfield, Kentucky, United States, the station serves the Evansville area.  The station is currently owned by Henson Media, Inc. and features programming from Fox Sports Radio and Kentucky Sports Radio.

FM Translator
In addition to the main station at 1550 kHz, WUCO is relayed by an FM translator, to widen its broadcast area, especially during nighttime hours when the AM frequency reduces power to only 6 watts.

History
The station went on the air in November 1960, and, with the exception of a brief period in 1999-2000 using the call sign WYGS, the station had always been known as WMSK.

On January 3, 2011, the station switched from its former classic country music format to sports, affiliating with Fox Sports Radio and Kentucky Sports Radio.

The station changed from WMSK to the current WUCO call sign on February 12, 2015.

References

External links

UCO
Sports radio stations in the United States
Morganfield, Kentucky
1960 establishments in Kentucky
Radio stations established in 1960